SuperMontage, abbreviated simply as SM, is an integrated trading system used in American stock exchange NASDAQ that was implemented in 2002.  It features a fully integrated public limit order book and market maker quotations, the ability to enter multiple quotes, anonymous ordering, five-level-deep buy and sell interest, and time-stamps on individual orders.

Test stock symbols
The SM system generally works behind the scenes, but on rare occasions it can be seen at work when a test symbol such as "ZVZZT" runs across the ticker.

NASDAQ strongly encourages firms to utilize test securities for testing their production systems.

References

Nasdaq